The Peninsula Point Light is a lighthouse located at the southern tip of the Stonington Peninsula in Bay de Noc township in Delta County, Michigan.  United States Coast Guard historical documents have over the years listed the name of the site as both Peninsula Point and Point Peninsula.

Service
The Stonington Peninsula juts into Lake Michigan from the southern coast of Michigan's Upper Peninsula at a key point along the shipping lanes to and from the docks of Escanaba and Gladstone, as a hazardous shoal extends more than  out into the lake, posing a hazard to shipping.  Thus the light had two purposes: (1) it marked a turning point; and (2) it warned mariners away from the rocks and shallows. Danger was inherent in the confluence of reefs and the shipping channels, through which fish, iron ore, lumber, along with other products were transported. "The U.S. Government recognized the need for a lighthouse on the peninsula to aid navigation around these dangerous shoals and reefs separating Big Bay de Noc, Little Bay de Noc, and Green Bay of Lake Michigan."

Although Congress voted funds to build the lighthouse founded in 1856. On July 20, 1864, funds were again appropriated for the building of a lighthouse on the Stonington Peninsula on July 20, 1864. It was not built until 1865 following the United States Civil War. It maintained as an active aid to navigation until 1934.

Point Peninsula Light's first keeper was Mr. Charles Beggs, who died there in 1887. The second keeper was Mr. Henry Corgan. Mr. Peter Knutsen was third. In 1889 Captain James D. Armstrong was appointed keeper and this was home to him and his family until 1922.

In 1922, by the United States Lighthouse Service installed an automatic acetylene light to replace the hand-operated oil lamp. Thus, it was no longer necessary to occupy the site since the light was automated. Captain Armstrong continued to be responsible for Peninsula Point until 1931.

Thereafter, the fourth-order lens was removed from the lantern and replaced by a  lens equipped with a 300-candlepower acetylene flasher Dalén light and sun valve. Upon this installation, the light's characteristic was changed to repeated 1-second flash followed by a nine-second eclipse, exhibited initially on the evening of May 20, 1922.

When the Minneapolis Shoal Light Station went into service. this light was decommissioned and abandoned in 1936. Its tower is open for visitors to climb into the cast iron lantern room at the top of a cast-iron spiral staircase. The attached lighthouse keeper's residence burnt in 1959, after it had been restored by the Stonington, Michigan Grange.

In 1937, the USDA-Forest Service "was granted custodianship." The building was repaired and public picnic grounds were constructed by the Civilian Conservation Corps.  The Stonington Grange took over maintenance of the structure and grounds. In 1949 the Grange won first prize in their State contest for their work at the lighthouse.

The house portion burned to the ground in 1959. Debris was cleared and damage to the north side of the tower repaired in 1962 by the USDA Forest Service.

Current status
The light is listed on the National Register of Historical Places, Reference #75000941, Name of Listing: PENINSULA POINT LIGHTHOUSE. It is not listed on the state registry.

The lighthouse tower is managed by the National Forest Service, which maintains a webpage for the light and picnic area.

Bird and butterfly migrations
Because of their placement on points of land, lighthouses are often situated on migratory pathways, and are so-called 'bird traps.' See Whitefish Point Light and Tawas Point Light.

The Stonington Peninsula plays a crucial role in the migration of the monarch butterfly, which gathers there in September before migrating across Lake Michigan to Door County, Wisconsin.  In the fall, thousands of monarch butterflies converge on the area to rest before their migration across Green Bay. It has been called the Point Pelee of the Upper Peninsula, and is an important bird area. The location is also an important location for migratory birds, and has been deemed to be a successful effort by the Hiawatha National Forest.

The area is said to be a rock hound's paradise. "The rocky shoreline yields fossils estimated at 400-500 million years old."

Getting there
The USDA Forest Service operates the grounds as a picnic area. There are ten tables and grills on the lawns surrounding the tower. Pit toilets are available, as well as drinking water.

The road that "progressively gets narrower and rougher, but the climb up the spiral staircase and the view from the ten-sided tower (which is open to the public), and "is worth the trip." The view is said to be "spectacular" so "Be sure to bring you camera." A parking area for RV's is available at the beginning of the narrowing road.

See also
 Lighthouses in the United States

Notes

External links

 Peninsula Point lighthouse and picnic area - official site at Hiawatha National Forest
 Interactive map on Michigan lighthouses, Detroit News

Lighthouses completed in 1865
Lighthouses on the National Register of Historic Places in Michigan
Michigan State Historic Sites
Civilian Conservation Corps in Michigan
Hiawatha National Forest
National Register of Historic Places in Delta County, Michigan
1865 establishments in Michigan